Hopewell is a town in Ontario County, New York, United States. The population was 3,841 at the 2020 census.

The Town of Hopewell is in the north central part of the county, east of the City of Canandaigua.

History
Significant portions of this section is sourced from Conover, Chapter XXV.

The Seneca Indian village of Onnaghee (or Onaghee, aka Snyder-McClure village) was located in Hopewell.  It was abandoned sometime before 1750, and the former residents likely founded the newer village at Canandaigua.

Settled beginning in 1789, the town of Hopewell, New York, was originally part of a tract of land first called "District of Easton" and then "Lincoln" and was part of the Phelps and Gorham Purchase of 1788.

The original settlers in the area were former New Englanders.  According to The History of Ontario County New York, some of the earliest pioneers included "Daniel Gates, Daniel Warner, Ezra Platt, Samuel Day, George Chapin, Israel Chapin, Jr., Frederick Follett, Thomas Sawyer, Benjamin Wells and Mr. Sweet, all of whom were from Massachusetts, while William Wyckoff who was another pioneer, was from Pennsylvania."

In 1807, the name of the town was changed again, this time to "Gorham," in honor of Nathaniel Gorham.  The Town of Hopewell was formed out of the northern section of the Town of Gorham on March 29, 1822.

On April 17, 1823, the first town meeting was held and the first town officers were elected.  They were:
 Supervisor – Nathan Lewis
 Town Clerk – John Prince
 Assessors – Elisha Higby, George Brundage, and James Birdseye
 Highway Commissioners – Joel S. Hart, Erastus Lamed, and William Canfield
 Overseers of the Poor – Rufus Warner and Lemuel Babcock
 Commissioner of Schools – William Buchan, Jason Angel, and Joshua Case
 Inspector of Schools – Joseph Merrill, William Bodman, and Joel Amsden
 Constables – Timothy Dunham, Hiram Dillon, William Lamed, and Joseph Parker
 Collector – Walter Wells
 Justice of the Peace – Nathaniel Lewis, John Price, Amos Jones and Elisha Higby

Between 1830 and 1890, the population of Hopewell ranged from 2,202 (1830) to 1,655 (1890).

In 1825 the County Board of Supervisors purchased farmland in the southeastern part of the town and established a home for the county poor. That land today is still owned by Ontario County and is used to house the County Health Facility, County Historian and Archives Center and other County facilities.

In 1844 members of the Fourier Society of the City of Rochester established the Ontario Union, a utopian community based on the works of French socialist Charles Fourier, in Hopewell. According to a Fourierist newspaper, the Ontario Union was located at Bates' Mills, about five miles from the main city of Canindagua, and was home to "chairmakers, carpenters, wheelrights, millwrights, edge tool makers, blacksmiths, machinists, carriage trimmers, &c."

Notable people
George R. Babcock, former New York State Senator
Henry Morrison Flagler, United States businessman and "Father of Miami," born in Hopewell (1830).
Frederick Follett, journalist, newspaper editor and politician 
Daniel Myron LeFever, American gunmaker, inventor of the hammerless shotgun, born in Hopewell (1835).
Edyth Walker, American opera singer of the Metropolitan Opera and Vienna State Opera, born in Hopewell (1867).

Geography

New York State Route 21 intersects New York State Route 488 in Chapin. The NY 5/US 20 concurrency runs through the southern part of the town.

Hopewell is near the northeastern end of Canandaigua Lake, one of the Finger Lakes.

Demographics

As of the census of 2000, there were 3,346 people, 1,244 households, and 888 families residing in the town.  The population density was 93.9 people per square mile (36.2/km2).  There were 1,342 housing units at an average density of 37.7 per square mile (14.5/km2).  The racial makeup of the town was 97.97% White, 0.78% African American, 0.30% Native American, 0.12% Asian, 0.03% Pacific Islander, 0.24% from other races, and 0.57% from two or more races. Hispanic or Latino of any race were 1.82% of the population.

There were 1,244 households, out of which 32.7% had children under the age of 18 living with them, 56.3% were married couples living together, 9.6% had a female householder with no husband present, and 28.6% were non-families. 21.1% of all households were made up of individuals, and 8.0% had someone living alone who was 65 years of age or older.  The average household size was 2.60 and the average family size was 2.98.

In the town, the population was spread out, with 24.3% under the age of 18, 7.7% from 18 to 24, 28.7% from 25 to 44, 24.5% from 45 to 64, and 14.8% who were 65 years of age or older.  The median age was 39 years. For every 100 females, there were 94.0 males.  For every 100 females age 18 and over, there were 93.4 males.

The median income for a household in the town was $41,604, and the median income for a family was $46,452. Males had a median income of $30,575 versus $23,354 for females. The per capita income for the town was $16,899.  About 4.0% of families and 7.6% of the population were below the poverty line, including 7.3% of those under age 18 and 4.5% of those age 65 or over.

Communities and locations in Hopewell
Aloquin  – A hamlet in the southeast corner of the town on NY-5 and US-20.
Canandaigua Lake Outlet – A stream crossing the northwest corner of the town.
Chapin (formerly "Chapinville") – A hamlet in the northeast corner of the town at the junction of Routes 21 and 488.  Although a railroad was built through the hamlet, the increase in business and commerce lasted only a short while.
Ennerdale – A hamlet south of Hopewell Center, located on the former Ennerdale Road, now known as County Road 47.
Hopewell Center (or "Hopewell") – A hamlet near the center of the town at the junction of County Roads 4 and 47.
Lewis – An historic location in the southeast part of the town.
Littleville – A hamlet on the northern town line, Littleville is the site of a grist mill built by Oliver Phelps in 1791.  The hamlet is named after Norman C. Little who ran the Phelps mill along with a store (Conover).

Climate

Schools/College
Hopewell has no school district of its own, and a number of school districts cover the town.  These include:
 City of Canandaigua School District
 Gorham-Middlesex (Marcus Whitman) School District
 Manchester-Shortsville (Red Jacket) School District
 Phelps-Clifton Springs (Midlakes) School District. 
 Finger Lakes Community College

References

Conover, George S., Ed. History of Ontario County New York. Syracuse, NY: D. Mason & Co., 1893.

Miscellaneous
 Hopewell is home to the Pageant of Steam Official site
 Hopewell is home to the Constellation Brands - Marvin Sands Performing Arts Center Official Site
 Hopewell is home to the Finger Lakes Community College Official site

External links
  Town of Hopewell government
  Early Hopewell history

Rochester metropolitan area, New York
Towns in Ontario County, New York
1822 establishments in New York (state)